American singer Kesha has released four full-length studio albums, one compilation album, two extended plays, 31 singles (including 11 as a featured artist), 11 promotional singles, and has made seven other guest appearances. As of 2017, she has sold over 41 million tracks and streams in the United States alone, and over 87 million tracks and streams worldwide. As of 2019, she has also accumulated approximately 7 billion on-demand streams and has sold over 14 million album equivalents worldwide bringing her record sales to stand at over 100 million equivalents worldwide. She is also one of the highest certified digital singles artists in the United States by the Recording Industry Association of America, with 35.5 million certified units as a lead act. She is also certified for 5 million albums in the country alone, bringing her total record certifications to stand at 40.5 million as a lead act. Including features, she is certified for 18 million digital singles, further bringing her total record certifications to 59 million overall in the country.

Kesha made her international debut in early 2009, serving as a featured artist on Flo Rida's "Right Round". Despite being uncredited in the United States, the song went number one in the country for six consecutive weeks, broke the record for most first-week sales with 636,000 downloads, and became one of the bestselling songs of the digital era. Kesha's debut studio album, Animal, followed in January 2010 and topped the American, Canadian, and Greek charts. The record's lead single and Kesha's debut solo single, "Tik Tok" (2009), reached number one in fourteen countries and spent nine consecutive weeks atop the Billboard Hot 100, becoming the longest running number one single of 2010. The song has brought total sales of 18 million copies worldwide as of 2019, therefore making it one of the best-selling digital singles of all time. Other singles from Animal, "Blah Blah Blah" (2010), "Your Love Is My Drug" (2010), and "Take It Off" (2010), experienced similar success, as did Kesha's features on 3OH!3's "My First Kiss" (2010) and Taio Cruz's "Dirty Picture" (2010). Kesha topped eight subcharts on Billboard 2010 Year-End Chart, including the Top New Artist, Hot 100 Songs and Hot 100 Artists subcharts, and was named Billboard artist of the year. The commercial and critical success of the singer's first album led to the release of the extended play Cannibal in November 2010, which went Platinum in the US. Its lead single, "We R Who We R" (2010), reached the top ten in ten countries, including a number one debut in the US. "Blow" (2011) also managed to peak within the top ten of multiple countries. In March 2011, a remix album named I Am the Dance Commander + I Command You to Dance: The Remix Album was released and topped the Billboard Dance/Electronic Albums chart. The following month, after writing all of the lyrics of American singer Britney Spears' global smash "Till the World Ends", Kesha was featured on a remix of the track alongside American rapper Nicki Minaj titled "the Femme Fatale remix". The remix propelled the single to the top five on the Canadian Hot 100 and the Billboard Hot 100.

Kesha's second studio album, Warrior, was made available for purchase in December 2012. It debuted at number six on the Billboard 200 chart. "Die Young" (2012) was selected as the record's lead single and peaked at number two in the United States, while charting in the top ten of eleven other countries. Followup singles "C'Mon" (2013) and "Crazy Kids" (2013) were released to moderate success. In October 2013, the singer was featured on Pitbull's single "Timber", which topped the charts in sixteen countries, including the Billboard Hot 100 in the United States. It has also since been certified diamond in the United States for sales of ten million units, making it both Kesha's and Pitbull's first diamond certified single in the country alone. It also became the sixth best-selling song of 2014 globally.

In 2017, after a controversial legal battle with longtime producer Dr. Luke, Kesha's comeback single, "Praying", was released as the lead single for her third studio album, Rainbow, both of which were nominated at the 60th Annual Grammy Awards ceremony. "Praying" reached number one in Hong Kong, while Rainbow did so in the US and Canada. The same year, Kesha was featured on American rapper Macklemore's single "Good Old Days", which has been certified Platinum in the US, Canada, and Australia.

In January 2020, Kesha released her fourth studio album High Road. It debuted at number seven on the Billboard 200, marking Kesha's fourth top-ten album on the chart.

Albums

Studio albums

Remix albums

Extended plays

Singles

As lead artist

As featured artist

Promotional singles

Other charted and certified songs

Songwriting credits

Notes

References

Discographies of American artists
Pop music discographies
Discography